Acer triflorum, the  three-flowered maple, is a species of maple native to hills of northeastern China (Heilongjiang, Jilin, Liaoning) and Korea.

It is a deciduous tree that reaches a height of about  but is usually smaller. It is a trifoliate maple related to such other species as Manchurian Maple (Acer mandshuricum) and Paperbark Maple (Acer griseum). It has yellowish-brown exfoliating bark that peels in woody scales rather than papery pieces like Acer griseum.

The flowers are yellow, produced in small corymbs of three small flowers each, hence the name.

Even more than its relatives, three-flower maple has spectacular fall colour that may include brilliant orange, scarlet, purple and gold. It is one of the few trees to develop good fall colour in shade.

Cultivation
The species was first introduced to cultivation in 1923. Although common in maple collections, it is rarely seen in cultivation outside of arboreta.

It grows at a slow to moderate rate and prefers moist, well drained soil; growth is often shrub-like in cultivation. It is relatively tolerant of drought and clay compared to its close relatives. It does not tolerate wet or over-compacted soil. Propagation is similar to that required for Acer griseum and the number of viable seeds is likewise very small.

It has gained the Royal Horticultural Society's Award of Garden Merit. In the United States, mature specimens can be seen at Arnold Arboretum in Boston, Massachusetts.

References

triflorum
Flora of Korea
Trees of China
Trees of Korea